Ñawinqucha (Quechua ñawi button hole / eye, -n a suffix, qucha lake, hispanicized spelling Nahuincocha) is a lake in Peru located in the Junín Region, Jauja Province, Canchayllo District, northeast of the Paryaqaqa mountain range. The lake belongs to the watershed of the Mantaro River. 

The dam is operated by Electroperu.

References 

Lakes of Peru
Lakes of Junín Region
Dams in Peru
Buildings and structures in Junín Region